IBM eServer was a family of computer servers from IBM. Announced in 2000, it combined the various IBM server brands (AS/400, Netfinity, RS/6000, S/390) under one brand. The various sub-brands were at the same time rebranded from:
IBM RS/6000 to IBM eServer pSeries, p for POWER
IBM AS/400 to IBM eServer iSeries, i for Integrated
IBM Netfinity to IBM eServer xSeries, x for eXtended architecture (with respect to "commodity" Intel-based servers)
IBM System/390 was replaced by the 64-bit IBM eServer zSeries, z for Zero downtime.

The RS/6000 SP supercomputer line was replaced by Blue Gene platform.

Discontinuation 
In 2005, IBM announced a new brand, IBM System, as an umbrella for all IBM server and storage brands. The rebranding was completed in 2006 when the IBM xSeries became the IBM System x (later the Lenovo System x).
IBM eServer zSeries became IBM System z
IBM eServer pSeries became IBM System p
IBM eServer iSeries became IBM System i
IBM eServer xSeries became IBM System x (later Lenovo System x)
IBM TotalStorage became IBM Storage
IBM eServer BladeCenter became IBM BladeCenter
IBM eServer 1350 became IBM System Cluster 1350

References

External links
IBM servers

eServer
eServer
Ultra-dense servers